Events from the year 1715 in Canada.

Incumbents
 French monarch: Louis XIV (died September 1), Louis XV (starting September 1)
 British and Irish monarch: George I

Governors
 Governor General of New France: Philippe de Rigaud Vaudreuil
 Colonial Governor of Louisiana: Antoine de la Mothe Cadillac
 Governor of Nova Scotia: Francis Nicholson then Samuel Vetch then Thomas Caulfeild
 Governor of Placentia: John Moody

Births
 Sir William Johnson, 1st Baronet, superintendent of northern Indians (died 1774)

 
Canada
15
1710s in Canada